This is the list of current, and formerly broadcast series by the Ghanaian television channel Tv3

Current broadcast

Former broadcast

Children

Series

Reality

References 

Lists of television series by network